Miniboox is a German publisher who manufactures and markets miniature books.

Collections 

The production goes of German literature and works of consecrated authors of the universal literature. 
Specialized also in technical and legal books, such as constitutions of countries of the world, such as the Constitution of the United States in miniature and also the Constitution of the European Union.

See also 
 The Smallest Books in the World, Peru

References 

Book publishing companies of Germany